Orchot Tzaddikim (Hebrew: ארחות צדיקים) is a book on Jewish ethics written in Germany in the 15th century, entitled Sefer ha-Middot by the author, but called Orḥot Ẓaddiḳim by a later copyist. Under this title a Yiddish translation, from which the last chapter and some other passages were omitted, was printed at Isny in 1542, although the Hebrew original did not appear until some years later (Prague, 1581). Subsequently, however, the book was frequently printed in both languages. The author of the work is unknown, although Güdemann (Gesch. iii. 223) advances the very plausible hypothesis that he was Lipmann Mühlhausen.

The book 
Most of the book is not original writing; it is following the order of "The Improvement of the Moral Qualities" by Solomon ibn Gabirol, adding paragraphs from many of Maimonides' works, and ideas from the famous ethical writings "Shaarei Tshuva" (by Rabbenu Yona of Gerona) and Chovot HaLevavot.

The Orḥot Ẓaddiḳim, which was designed to be a very popular code of ethics, contains the following maxims among others:
 "It is evil pride to despise others, and to regard one's own opinion as the best, since such an attitude bars progress, while egotism increases bitterness toward others and decreases thine own capability of improvement" (ch. i.).
 "Be just and modest in association with others, and practice humility even toward the members of the household, toward the poor, and toward dependents. The more property thou hast, the greater should be thy humility, and thy honor and beneficence toward mankind" (ch. ii.).
 "Be kind to thy non-Jewish servants; make not their burdens heavy, nor treat them scornfully with contemptuous words or blows" (ch. viii.).
 "Forget not the good qualities thou lackest, and note thy faults; but forget the good that thou hast done, and the injuries thou hast received" (ch. xx.).
 "Abash not him who hath a bodily blemish, or in whose family there is some stain. If one hath done evil and repented, name not his deed in his presence, even in jest, nor refer to a quarrel which has been ended, lest the dead embers be rekindled" (ch. xxi.).

In ch. xxvii. the author bitterly attacks the pilpul method of study, reproves his countrymen who engage in this method of Talmud study, and reproaches those who neglect the study of the Bible and of all sciences.

Authorship
According to Rabbi Gil Student,  "Orechos Tzadikim is an anonymous mussar sefer that has enjoyed a lasting impact on Judaism. It is surprising that the sefer was never attributed to anyone...we can state with certainty is that the author lived in or after the early 14th century. Despite being influenced by the German Chasidim, he was a follower of the French Ba’alei Ha-Tosafos. We can suggest that the author lived in the late 14th century in France or among French exiles, but not in Germany or Spain.

There is speculation that the book was authored by a female, owing to the author's heavy reliance on biblical passages as sources, as opposed to Talmudic passages, and choosing to publish anonymously. However, publishing anonymously may merely indicate the author's very example of character development. Additionally, notwithstanding the author's frequent usage of biblical sources, the author was clearly well versed in Talmudic passages and at one point sharply criticizes the pilpul method of Talmud study, recommending a more traditional approach. There is, however, internal evidence that the author may have been thinking within the world of women at the time, such as the use of cooking metaphors.

Jewish Encyclopedia bibliography 
Zunz, Z. G. p. 129;
Benjacob, Oẓar ha-Sefarim, p. 51, No. 989;
Güdemann, Gesch. iii. 223 et seq.;
Winter and Wünsche, Die Jüdische Litteratur, iii. 639–641.

References

External links 
Jewish Encyclopedia article for Orchot Tzaddikim, by Isidore Singer and Jacob Zallel Lauterbach.
Sefer ha-Middot - Orhot Zaddikim – Images of manuscripts and early printed editions (PDF); Simanei Sefer ha-Middot (a lost section of Orhot Zaddikim recovered from the earliest extant manuscript of the book); notes on manuscripts, editions, and the time period of the anonymous author. All material available under an open content license.
Orchot Tzaddikim at Hebrew Wikisource (full text in Hebrew).

 Orchot Tzaddikim for android.

Jewish philosophical and ethical texts
Jewish medieval literature
Hebrew-language religious books
Sifrei Kodesh